The 2011 IIHF University Challenge Cup of Asia was the second IIHF University Challenge Cup of Asia, an annual international ice hockey tournament held by the International Ice Hockey Federation (IIHF). It was held from May 19 to May 22, 2011 in Changchun, China. Japan won the tournament for the second year in a row after defeating South Korea in the gold medal game.

Overview
The 2011 IIHF University Challenge Cup of Asia began on May 19, 2010 in Changchun, China. The tournament expanded to four teams with the inclusion of Chinese Taipei. The first game was played between South Korea and Chinese Taipei with South Korea winning the game 13–1. Japan won the tournament for the second year in a row after defeating South Korea in the gold medal game. South Korea finished in second place while China finished in third after defeating Chinese Taipei in the bronze medal game. Yokuto Takami of Japan was named the tournaments best forward, Hyunggon Cho of South Korea the tournaments best defenceman and Ren Yamaguchi of Japan the best goaltender.

Standings

Fixtures

Bronze medal game

Gold medal game

References

External links
International Ice Hockey Federation

Uni
2011 in Chinese sport
2011 University
International ice hockey competitions hosted by China
Asian ice hockey competitions for junior teams